Adam Griffith (born Andrzej Dębowski) is a former American football placekicker for the University of Alabama Crimson Tide from Calhoun, Georgia. As a player for Alabama (2013–2016) he helped his team earn two National Championships and four SEC Championships. He was inducted into the Calhoun High School hall of fame.

Career
At Alabama he was the all-time leader for extra point kicks with 186. He is fifth all-time with 57 field goals.

Highlights

November 8, 2014- A game-tying field goal against LSU on the last play of the 4th quarter.  Alabama won in overtime 20-13.

November 7, 2015- A career-long 55-yard field goal against LSU.

November 28, 2015- Five field goals against Auburn in a 29-13 win.

January 11, 2016- A perfectly placed on-side kick in the National Championship game against Clemson helping the Crimson Tide achieve a 45-40 victory.

The "Kick Six" 
November 30, 2013 - Griffith's kick to win the Iron Bowl came up short from 57 yards out, allowing Auburn returner Chris Davis to bring the kick back 109 yards for the game winning touchdown.

Draft
In 2017 Griffith was considered a top five kicker. He went undrafted in the 2017 NFL draft.

Personal life
He was born Andrzej Dębowski and he grew up in an orphanage in Poland. When he was 13 he was adopted and moved to Georgia. He was adopted by two teachers, Tom and Michelle Griffith. He was one of seven children in the Dębowski family. The substance abuse issues of his parents forced the Polish courts to take all of the children away.

See also
List of orphans

References

External links
Kick 6 (2013)
Griffith's onside kick against Clemson (2016)

Living people
American football placekickers
American adoptees
Alabama Crimson Tide football players
Polish players of American football
Polish emigrants to the United States
Players of American football from Georgia (U.S. state)
People from Calhoun, Georgia
Year of birth missing (living people)
Calhoun High School alumni